The Björn Steiger Foundation (Björn Steiger Stiftung) is a German charity which assists in providing funding for emergency services, and rescue organisations. It is named after a 8-year-old child, Björn Steiger, who died in 1969 after being hit by a car whilst returning home from a communal swimming pool. Despite several calls to emergency services it took nearly one hour until paramedics arrived. Björn Steiger died from shock on the way to the hospital.  Shortly after this incident, his parents, Siegfried and Ute Steiger, set up the foundation in his memory.

References

External links
 Björn Steiger Foundation

Health charities in Germany
Medical and health organisations based in Baden-Württemberg